State Route 59 (SR 59) is a state highway in the U.S. state of California located entirely in Merced County. It connects State Route 152 near El Nido to the city of Merced and beyond, ending abruptly at the intersection of County Routes J59 and J16 in Snelling.

Route description
SR 59 begins at SR 152 as Los Banos Highway. The highway travels north through the town of El Nido until entering the city of Merced, where it runs concurrently with the SR 99 freeway and with SR 140. SR 59 leaves the concurrency on the west side of Merced and travels north as the Snelling Highway. The highway winds up the Sierra Nevada foothills until it passes through Snelling, where it ends.

SR 59 is part of the California Freeway and Expressway System, but except for a portion in Merced is not part of the National Highway System, a network of highways that are considered essential to the country's economy, defense, and mobility by the Federal Highway Administration.

Future
In January 2010, the Tuolumne County board of supervisors made a formal request to the state to add the entire length of County Route J59 as a northerly extension of State Route 59 from its terminus in Snelling, Merced County, to the intersection of State Routes 108 and 120 in Tuolumne County.

Major intersections

See also

References

Compass Maps: Merced, Atwater, Merced County

External links

California Highways: Route 59
California @ AARoads.com - State Route 59
Caltrans: Route 59 highway conditions

059
State Route 059
Merced, California